Torchy Millar (born 20 August 1945) is a Canadian equestrian. He competed at the 1968 Summer Olympics and the 1972 Summer Olympics.

References

1945 births
Living people
Canadian male equestrians
Olympic equestrians of Canada
Equestrians at the 1968 Summer Olympics
Equestrians at the 1972 Summer Olympics
Pan American Games medalists in equestrian
Pan American Games gold medalists for Canada
Pan American Games silver medalists for Canada
Equestrians at the 1971 Pan American Games
Equestrians at the 1983 Pan American Games
Sportspeople from Calgary
Medalists at the 1971 Pan American Games
Medalists at the 1983 Pan American Games
21st-century Canadian people
20th-century Canadian people